Eastern Line is a railway line in Thailand, built and owned by State Railway of Thailand (SRT), located in Bangkok, Chachoengsao Province, Nakhon Nayok Province, Saraburi Province, Prachinburi Province, Sa Kaeo Province, Chonburi Province, and Rayong Province. It is the most important freight transport line in Thailand because there are many freight trains on the line. It was opened on 24 January 1907.

There are plans to incorporate the line as part of the eastern branch line on the Kunming–Singapore railway.

Timeline
 24 January 1907: Hua Lamphong – 
 1 January 1924: Chachoengsao Junction – 
 8 November 1926: Kabin Buri – 
 14 July 1989: Chachoengsao Junction – Sattahip
 22 April 2019: Aranyaprathet – Ban Klong Luk – 
 
In 1941, SRT built a 17-kilometer railway line into Cambodia, but five years later, that line was removed because of World War II ending. In 1953, the SRT rebuilt the 6-kilometer rail line into Cambodia upon Cambodia's request and opened it on 22 April 1955, though it was closed again in 1961 due to strained Cambodia-Thailand relations. The cross-border link between Aranyaprathet briefly Poipet briefly opened in April 2019, but closed again in April 2020 due to the COVID-19 pandemic.

Connecting lines
The lines are divided into three main lines:
 Aranyaprathet Main Line: from Bangkok to Aranyaprathet, Sa Kaeo Province (with an extension to Poipet, Cambodia)
 Ban Phlu Ta Luang Main Line: from Bangkok to Sattahip District, Chonburi Province, there is only one passenger train per day.
 Phra Phutthachai Line: shortcut linking Eastern Line and Northeastern Line (Thailand), there are only freight trains on this line, and there is one tunnel, Phra Phutthachai Tunnel.

Other branch lines:
 Makkasan – Maenam
 Lat Krabang – ICD
 Sriracha Junction – Laem Chabang Deep Sea Port
 Khao Chi Chan Junction – Map Taphut

Notable railway stations
The Eastern Line begins at Bangkok before heading through Chachoengsao, Prachinburi to terminate at Aranyaprathet in Sa Kaew Province, 255 kilometers from Bangkok. There is a reopened rail link to Cambodia from Aranyaprathet. A branch line also connects Khlong Sip Kao Junction to the Northeastern Line at Kaeng Khoi Junction. At Chachoengsao Junction, there is another branch to Sattahip. Along the route to Sattahip, at Si Racha Junction, there is yet another branch towards Laem Chabang Deep Sea Port and further at Khao Chi Chan Junction for Map Ta Phut Port, in Rayong.

 Makkasan station - the main depot of SRT (Makkasan Works)
 Hua Mak station - Bangkok suburban station
 Hua Takhe station - Junction for ICD.
 Chachoengsao Junction - Junction for Laem Chabang (double track opened January 2012) and Aranyaprathet Line. Main Chachoengsao station.
 Khlong Sip Kao Junction - Junction for the Aranyaprathet Line and the Cargo Link to Kaeng Khoi Junction.
 Prachin Buri station - Main Prachin Buri Province Rail Station.
 Kabin Buri station - Half of long-distance Aranyaprathet Line services terminate here. In Prachin Buri Province.
 Sa Kaeo station - Main Sa Kaeo station
 Ban Klong Luk Border station - Terminus of Aranyaprathet Main Line. (only freight trains cross the border)
 Chonburi station- Main Chonburi station
 Si Racha Junction - Junction for Laem Chabang Deep Sea Port.
 Pattaya station - Railway station for Pattaya City.
 Khao Chi Chan Junction- Junction for Sattahip Commercial Port and Map Taphut Freight Line
 Ban Phlu Ta Luang station - Terminus for current, operational, ordinary train from Bangkok.
 Map Ta Phut station - Terminus of East Coast Line - freight trains only.

See also
 Northern Line (Thailand)
 Northeastern Line (Thailand)
 Southern Line (Thailand)
 Airport Rail Link (Bangkok)
 Don Mueang–Suvarnabhumi–U-Tapao high-speed railway

References

Railway lines in Thailand
Railway lines opened in 1907
Metre gauge railways in Thailand